The 2006–07 Cincinnati Bearcats men's basketball team represented the University of Cincinnati during the 2006–07 NCAA Division I men's basketball season. The team played its home games in Cincinnati, Ohio at the Fifth Third Arena, which has a capacity of 13,176. They are members of the Big East Conference and were led by first year head coach Mick Cronin. The Bearcats finished the season 11–19, 2–14 in Big East play.

Offseason

Departures

Incoming Transfers

Recruiting class of 2006

Recruiting class of 2007

Roster

Depth chart

Schedule and results

|-
!colspan=12 style=|Exhibition
|-

|-
!colspan=12 style=|Regular Season 
|-

|-
!colspan=12 style=|Big East Regular Season
|-

References

External links 
2006–07 Cincinnati Bearcats Roster and Stats at Sports-Reference.com

Cincinnati Bearcats men's basketball seasons
Cincinnati
Cincin
Cincin